Stojan Čupić (ca. 1765 – 1815) was a Serbian revolutionary general (vojvoda), one of the most important commanders of the First Serbian Uprising. He was active in the Mačva region.


Early life
Born in Piva, in the Sanjak of Herzegovina (now in Montenegro), his original surname was Dobrilović (Добриловић). He was brought up in Salaš Crnobarski (at that time known as Ali-Agin Salaš) in Mačva in the Sanjak of Smederevo (now in Serbia), where he was schooled. He lived with his grandfather, Todor "Toda", his parents being dead. His grandfather was a chieftain in his home village, but moved for an unknown reason to Serbia, leaving his sons back home. The sons died, so Stojan and his three older sisters went to live with grandfather Toda. Strahinja Čupić, a rich man without children from Salaš Noćajski, adopted Stojan when he was a boy, and brought him up "as though he was of his own blood". His adoptive father found a girl for him, and he married, so that he could inherit. Stojan worked in trade.

Career

Stojan Čupić first met Karađorđe, a pig trader and Austrian veteran, somewhere in the Valjevo nahija in 1804. In 1805, Stojan began assembling his own band (among whom were Zeka Buljubaša), which closed off roads in Mačva by the Drina river, and dug trenches from Zasavica to the Sava – from where he attacked Turks crossing the Drina. He quickly became a local hero, feared by the Turks.

At the end of July 1806, the Vizier with 45,000 soldiers dispatched from Šabac heading for Belgrade. At the same time, Karađorđe had left the Morava with 8–9,000 soldiers and awaited the Ottoman forces on the field of Mišar. The Serb rebels destroyed the Ottomans in the battle; the decimated Ottoman troops were forced to retreat to Šabac, from where they would leave for Bosnia. Čupić, who participated in the battle, hurried to Mačva to intercept the fleeing Ottoman troops; near Drenovac he cut down acclaimed Mula of Sarajevo. 

Along with Karađorđe and other notable commanders, he participated in the bloody Battle of Loznica (1810), which left many Turks dead. He was wounded during the battle, but still managed to save Cincar-Janko's life, about to be slain by an armored Turk soldier.

At the beginning of September 1813, the Serbian rebels were defeated at Ravnje, by a strong Ottoman force commanded by French officers. The rebels were forced to retreat; Čupić swam over the Zasavica and arrived at Šabac, where he together with his blood brother, vojvode Luka Lazarević, started organizing the defense of the city. When the Ottomans assembled a very large force outside the city, the rebel soldiers run asunder, leaving the commanders, who concluded that it was impossible to defend the city.  Luka Lazarević sent his family to Syrmia, while he, Čupić, and their men descended the Sava to Zabrežje, from where they crossed the Sava into Austrian territory (Military Frontier), in order to save their lives. As other commanders, he found refuge in Syrmia. However, after a short period of time, he returned to Mačva, staying in the forests.

There are several stories about his death:
Ahead of the Second Serbian Uprising (1815), Čupić had returned to Serbia and raised the people against the Turks; according to Konstantin Nenadović he came into conflict with Miloš Obrenović, another vojvode; Obrenović ordered that he be betrayed to the Turks, who then murdered him.
According to Milan Milićević, he met with Obrenović, who then had him sent to rise up Mačva. Some serfs and others in Mačva (listed by Milićević) were not ready to break the peace, thus conspired against Čupić, whom they thought was the only one planning to raise a rebellion. They contacted the Turks in Bosnia and promised his head. Marashli Ali Pasha and his men waited in ambush at the given place, where the serfs took him, having told him that they would meet up with an ammunition dealer who he knew. He was taken to Vizier Rushid Pasha, where he was nicely received, then sent to Zvornik. There, he was thrown into jail bound in cuffs. He died after a month. A Dimitrije Nogić learned of the conspiracy and killed several of the serfs.

Aftermath
Obrenović became the supreme leader of the Second Serbian Uprising. Čupić left a son, Toma, and two daughters, Vasilija and Tomanija "Toka", after him. His son had seven children, all of whom died before him. The daughters married in Šabac. According to Konstantin Nenadović, contemporary authors, such as Moler, Radič and Cukić, tried to hide the truth about Čupić's death, and fabricated a story that Čupić had turned himself over to the Turks.

Character
Čupić was tall, with a slender waist, wide shoulders, mid-boned, and had strong muscles and long fingers. He had a long face, and a large brown moustache. At the time of his death he was about 50 years old, without gray hair. He was very talkative, and held long speeches on many assemblies in Belgrade. He was just in trials, and a friend of the poor. He wore armour and a steel helmet. He rode the best horses, his favourite being a dark bay horse called "Pejza" (who is also the theme of a poem). He was described as usually quick, both in thinking and execution, and undeniably heroic.

Legacy
 
Stojan Čupić distinguished himself at the battles of Mišar (1806); Glavica in Bosnia, where he also saved Cincar-Janko's life; Klenje; Bajina Bašta, when he also dueled beg Zulumbić in Bosnia; and Crnobarski Salaš, about which Filip Višnjić authored a poem. He was dubbed "the Dragon of Noćaj" (Zmaj od Noćaja) in the epic poetry due to his quick-thinking and heroism.

A statue has been erected in his honour in front of the church in Salaš Noćajski. There are several streets named after him, such as in Belgrade, Niš, and others. An annual cultural festival named after him is held at Salaš Noćajski. A relative of his has planned to recreate the church he founded in 1811 in the village (2009). His clothing and weapons are at display in the Museum in Šabac.

One of his few remaining descendants is Matija Čupić.

See also
List of Serbian Revolutionaries

References

Sources

External links

 

1765 births
1815 deaths
People from Sremska Mitrovica
Serbs of Vojvodina
Serbs of Montenegro
18th-century Serbian people
19th-century Serbian people
People of the First Serbian Uprising
Serbian military leaders
Serbian revolutionaries
Hajduks
Burials at Serbian Orthodox monasteries and churches